Beadlow is a hamlet in the Central Bedfordshire district of Bedfordshire, England. At the 2011 Census the population of the hamlet was included in the civil parish of Campton and Chicksands.

It is located around a mile and a half east of Clophill, of whose civil parish it forms a part, and around two and a half miles west of Shefford, in whose post town it lies. The River Flit flows through the hamlet.

See also
Beadlow Priory

External links

Hamlets in Bedfordshire
Central Bedfordshire District